Mercabarna is a Barcelona Metro station, located in the Mercabarna market complex of the Zona Franca in the Sants-Montjuïc district of Barcelona. The station is served by line L9.

The station is located underneath the western approach to the Mercabarna market, with its only entrance provided by a staircase and elevator at the intersection of Carrer K and the Carrer Transversal 6, with a ticket office below ground.

The station was opened in 2016, at the time of the extension of line L9 from Zona Universitaria station to Aeroport T1 station.

References

External links
Trenscat.com

Barcelona Metro line 9 stations
Railway stations in Spain opened in 2016